Running on the Rock was a 1986 extended play album by British rock band Shriekback.

Track listing
"Running on the Rocks"
"Bludgeoned (by the chairleg of the truth)"
"On A Razor's Edge (Live)"
"Hammerheads (Live)"

Personnel
Barry Andrews - keyboards, synthesizers, vocals
Dave Allen - bass
Martyn Barker - drums

Shriekback albums
1986 EPs
Island Records EPs